Hualipayoc (possibly from Quechua wamanripa, a species of Senecio, -yuq a suffix) is a mountain in the Vilcanota mountain range in the Andes of Peru, about  high. It is situated in the Cusco Region, Quispicanchi Province, Ocongate District. Hualipayoc lies northwest of mount Alcamarinayoc and southeast of Lake Singrenacocha.

References 

Mountains of Peru
Mountains of Cusco Region